Gabriel Aghion is a French film director and screenwriter.

Aghion was born in Alexandria, in Egypt on 30 December 1955.

He is openly gay.

Selected filmography
 La Scarlatine (1983)
 Bras de Fer (1985)
 Rue du Bac (1990)
 Pédale douce (1996)
 Belle maman (1999)
 Le Libertin (1999)
 Absolument fabuleux (2001)
 Pédale dure (2004)
 Un autre monde (TV) (2011) 
 Manon Lescaut (TV) (2013) 
 Avec le temps (TV) (2014)

References

External links

1955 births
Living people
Writers from Alexandria
French film directors
French male screenwriters
French LGBT screenwriters
LGBT film directors
Gay screenwriters
Egyptian LGBT people
French gay writers
Egyptian emigrants to France